Oleh Anatoliyovych Kolesov (born 15 February 1969) is a Ukrainian professional football coach and a former goalkeeper. He is the Master of Sports of Ukraine.

In February 2019 he was appointed a head coach of FC Krymteplytsia Molodizhne from the Crimean Premier League.

Honours
Tavriya Simferopol
 Ukrainian Premier League champion: 1992.

References

External links
 Олег КОЛЕСОВ: "Вратарем нужно родиться" (Oleh Kolesov: "One needs to be born as a goalkeeper"). Interview 2008 with Krymsky Obozrevatel.
 Profile at Tavria website
 Profile at Zoria website

1969 births
Association football goalkeepers
FC Krymteplytsia Molodizhne managers
FC Metalist Kharkiv players
FC Stal Kamianske players
FC Vorskla Poltava players
Living people
MFC Mykolaiv players
SC Tavriya Simferopol players
Soviet footballers
Footballers from Dnipro
Ukrainian football managers
Ukrainian footballers
Ukrainian Premier League players